Nisma Cherrat (Nisma Bux-Cherrat, born 1969 in Casablanca, Morocco) is an Afro-German actress.

Life and career
She grew up in the Schwarzwald region in Germany and attended 1989 to 1992 the Neue Münchner Schauspielschule. She studied classical singing 1993 to 1995 with Bennie Gillette in Munich and at the Jazzschool München.

Nisma Cherrat is a founding member of the SFD - Schwarze Filmschaffende in Deutschland (Black Artists in German Film) association.

Cherrat was trained at the Schlaffhorst-Andersen school in Bad Nenndorf
 as teacher for respiratory and speech therapy. Since July 2011 she works for a research project at the Freiburger Institute for Musicians' Medicine of the University of Music in Freiburg, Germany.

Film and TV work 
Warten auf Gott (Series) (1992 ARD)
Spieglein (2000 Filmhochschule Köln)
Valley of the Innocent (dir. Branwen Okpako, 2003 ZDF)

Theatre work (selection) 
Skins als Gloria (1992 Kampnagel Kulturfabrik)
Mephisto als Juliette (1995 Landesbühnen Sachsen)
Diener zweier Herren als Smeraldina (1995 Landesbühnen Sachsen)
Hexenjagd als Tituba (1995 Pfalztheater Kaiserslautern)
Hechinger als Mpenzi (1997 Thalia Theater Hamburg)
Die Blume von Hawaii als Raka (2000 Staatsschauspiel Dresden)
Tartuffe als Dorin (2001 See-Burgtheater Schweiz)
Der Streit als Carise (2002 Stadttheater Bielefeld)
Hysterikon als Mädchen mit Impuls (2003 Theater Kosmos, Bregenz)
I have a dream als Coretta King (2004 Tourneetheater Kempf)
Mephisto als Juliette (2006 Theater Hof)

Publikation 
Mätresse – Wahnsinnige – Hure: Schwarze SchauspielerInnen am deutschsprachigen Theater in Mythen, Masken und Subjekte Kritische Weißseinsforschung in Deutschland (2006, Unrast Verlag)

References

External links 

Website (in German)

German television actresses
German film actresses
Living people
1969 births
German people of Moroccan descent
People from Casablanca
German stage actresses
20th-century German actresses
21st-century German actresses
Moroccan emigrants to Germany